Lake Rousseau is a reservoir on the Withlacoochee River in central Florida, on the boundary of Levy County to the north-west, Marion County to the north-east, and Citrus County to the south. It was created in the early 1900s when the river was dammed. Florida Power Corp operated a hydroelectric plant from 1909 to 1965 at the western end of the lake. Power output was approximately 10,000 HP, or 7.45 MW.

As well as forming part of the Withlacoochee River, it is also fed by the Rainbow River and Lake Panasoffkee to the east. It is approximately twelve miles long by one mile wide, covering an area of c. 3,700 acres (15 km2). To the west is part of the uncompleted Cross Florida Barge Canal leading to the Gulf.

The lake forms the centerpiece for the Lake Rousseau State Recreation Area and Campground.

References

External links
 Lake Rousseau website
 Lake Rousseau RV & Fishing Resort
 

Rousseau
Protected areas of Levy County, Florida
Protected areas of Marion County, Florida
Protected areas of Citrus County, Florida
Rousseau
Rousseau
Rousseau
1900s establishments in Florida